Galgano Guidotti (1148 – 3 December 1181) was a Catholic saint from Tuscany born in Chiusdino, in the modern province of Siena, Italy. His mother's name was Dionigia, while his father's name (Guido or Guidotto) only appeared in a document dated in the 16th century, when the last name Guidotti was attributed.

The canonization process to declare Galgano a saint started in 1185, only a few years after his death, and his canonization was the first conducted with a formal process by the Roman Church. A lot of Galgano's life is known through the documents of the canonization process in 1185 and other Vitae: Legenda beati Galgani by anonymous,  Legenda beati Galgani confessoris by an unknown Cistercian monk, Leggenda di Sancto Galgano, Vita sancti Galgani de Senis, Vita beati Galgani.

Biography
The son of a feudal lord, Galgano became a knight, and is said to have led a ruthless life in his early years.

Galgano died in 1181. Soon after, in 1184, a round chapel was built over his claimed tomb to commemorate him; pilgrims came there in large numbers, and miracles were claimed. In that year, Cistercian monks took over Montesiepi at the request of Hugh, bishop of Volterra, but most of Galgano's monks left, scattered over Tuscany, and became Augustinian hermits. By 1220, San Galgano Abbey, a large Cistercian monastery, had been built below Galgano's hermitage: he was then claimed and recognized as a Cistercian saint. His cult was lively in Siena and Volterra, where numerous representations survive. The ruins of his hermitage can still be seen, while his cloak is kept in the church of Santuccio at Siena.

The sword in the stone

The sword in the stone can be seen at the Rotonda at Montesiepi, near the ruins of the Abbey of San Galgano. The handle of a sword protrudes from a stone, and is said to be the sword of Galgano. An analysis of the metal done in 2001 by Luigi Garlaschelli confirmed that the "composition of the metal and the style are compatible with the era of the legend". The analysis also confirmed that the upper piece and the invisible lower one are authentic and belong to one and the same artifact.

In the media

Television
Galgano's "sword in the stone" story was featured in a season 7 episode of TV series, Forged in Fire. Bladesmiths had to recreate "Excalibur", a medieval broadsword possibly inspired by Galgano's story. The episode explained the story as follows: the actual Sword in the Stone is located in Siena, Italy, and believed to have belonged to Galgano.

An episode of Ancient X-files looked at the sword in the stone and the connections between it, and St Galgano, to Sir Gawain and King Arthur. It included some scientific exploration of the stone.

See also
 Excalibur

References
Footnotes

Citations

External links
 The Life of Saint Galgano on Audiobook by Alleluia Audiobooks (on mp3)
 What to do in and around San Galgano Abbey (with Google Map)
 website with information about San Galgano Abbey
 Discovering San-Galganos Abbey
 San-Galgano and the sword in the stone; King Arthur in Tuscany
 Very informative website about the Abbey of San Galgano, history, pictures, info, map, accommodation and lots more

1148 births
1180s deaths
People from the Province of Siena
Medieval Italian saints
12th-century Christian saints
Angelic visionaries
Medieval legends
Medieval Italian knights